Hermann Buhl (21 September 1924 – 27 June 1957) was an Austrian mountaineer. He was innovative in applying Alpine style to Himalayan climbing. His accomplishments include the first ascents of Nanga Parbat in 1953 and Broad Peak in 1957.

Early life

Buhl was born in Innsbruck, the youngest of four children. After the death of his mother, he spent years in an orphanage.
Before Scouting was banned in Austria, Hermann Buhl was a Cub Scout in Innsbruck. In the 1930s, as a sensitive (and not very healthy) teenager, he began to climb the Austrian Alps. In 1939, he joined the Innsbruck chapter of the Deutscher Alpenverein (the German Alpine association) and soon mastered climbs up to category 6. He was a member of the Mountain rescue team in Innsbruck (Bergrettung Innsbruck).

World War II interrupted his commercial studies, and he joined the Alpine troops, mostly on the Monte Cassino. After being taken prisoner by American troops, he returned to Innsbruck and earned his living doing odd jobs. At the end of the 1940s, he finally completed his training as a mountain guide.

Himalayas

Nanga Parbat 

Before his successful 1953 Nanga Parbat expedition, 31 people had died trying to make the first ascent.

Buhl is the only mountaineer to have made the first ascent of an eight-thousander solo. His climbing partner, Otto Kempter, was too slow in joining the ascent, so Buhl struck off alone. He returned 41 hours later, having barely survived the arduous climb to the summit, 6.5 km (4 miles) distant from, and 1.2 km (4,000 feet) higher than, camp V. 

Experienced climbers, upon hearing later of Buhl's near-death climb, faulted him for making the attempt solo. Regardless, his monumental efforts, along with spending the night standing on a tiny pedestal too small to squat upon, untethered, on the edge of a 60-degree ice slope, have become mountaineering legend.

Broad Peak 
The first ascent of Broad Peak was made between June 8 and 9, 1957, by Fritz Wintersteller, Marcus Schmuck, Kurt Diemberger, and Buhl of an Austrian expedition led by Schmuck. A first attempt by the team had been made on May 29, when Fritz Wintersteller and Kurt Diemberger reached the forepeak (8030 m). This was also accomplished without the aid of supplemental oxygen, high-altitude porters or base camp support.

Chogolisa 
Just a few weeks after the successful first ascent of Broad Peak, Buhl and Diemberger made an attempt on nearby, unclimbed Chogolisa (7665 m) in Alpine style. Buhl lost his way in an unexpected snow storm and walked over a huge cornice on the south-east ridge, near the summit of Chogolisa II (7654 m; also known as Bride Peak), subsequently triggering an avalanche that hurled him down 900 m over Chogolisa's north face. His body could not be recovered and remains in the ice.

Legacy
Hermann Buhl is still considered by alpinists and mountaineering historians to be the most complete and advanced mountaineer of his time.  His ascents on rock and snow, solo and as a rope leader, his attitude towards the mountain and his physical elegance have been assessed by such contemporary luminaries as Kurt Diemberger, Marcus Schmuck, Heinrich Harrer, Walter Bonatti and Gaston Rébuffat. He was also an idol and hero of climbers of younger generations, such as Reinhold Messner, Peter Habeler and Hansjörg Auer. 

Buhl can be considered a pioneer of Alpine style mountaineering in the Himalayas, a style defined by light-weight expedition gear, little to no fixed ropes and the relinquishing of bottled oxygen.

His expedition to Nanga Parbat was dramatized by Donald Shebib in the 1986 film The Climb, based in part on Buhl's own writings about the expedition and starring Bruce Greenwood as Buhl.

Publications

See also
 List of famous Austrians
 List of Austrian mountaineers
 List of climbers

References

External links

Team Member of the Austrian OEAV Karakoram Expedition 1957
Hermann Buhl Page with biography and many photos, in German

1924 births
1957 deaths
Austrian mountain climbers
Mountaineering deaths
Sport deaths in Pakistan
Sportspeople from Innsbruck
Gebirgsjäger of World War II
German prisoners of war in World War II held by the United States